Denmark is competing at the 2013 World Championships in Athletics in Moscow, Russia, from 10–18 August 2013.
A team of 2 athletes was announced to represent the country in the event.

Results
(Q - qualified, q – qualified by lucky losers, NM – no mark, SB – season best)

Men
Track and road events

Field events

References

External links
IAAF World Championships – Denmark

Nations at the 2013 World Championships in Athletics
World Championships in Athletics
2013